The Kolopom languages are a family of Trans–New Guinea languages in the classifications of Stephen Wurm (1975) and of Malcolm Ross (2005). Along with the Mombum languages, they are the languages spoken on Yos Sudarso Island (Kolopom Island).

Languages
The Kolopom languages are,
Kimaama (Kimaghama), Riantana
Ndom
Moraori

Proto-language

Phonemes
Usher (2020) reconstructs the consonant inventory as follows:

{| 
| *m || *n ||  ||  
|-
| *p || *t || *s || *k
|-
| *mb || *nd || *ndz || *ŋg 
|-
| [*w] || [*r] || [*j] || [*ɣ] 
|}

{| 
|*i|| ||*u
|-
|*e||*ɵ||*o
|-
|*æ||*a||
|}

Pronouns
Usher (2020) reconstructs the pronouns as:
{| 
! !!sg!!pl
|-
!1
|*n[a/o] ||*nie
|-
!2
|*K[a/o] (?) ||*ŋgie
|-
!3
|*ep ||*emDe
|}

Basic vocabulary
Some lexical reconstructions by Usher (2020) are:

{| class="wikitable sortable"
! gloss !! Proto-Kolopom
|-
| head || *tipV; *mVrV[w]
|-
| hair/feathers || *muen[a]
|-
| ear/mind || ? *mVrVk; *[ndz][o/u]an
|-
| eye || *VnV
|-
| nose || *ŋgon
|-
| tooth || *t[e]r[a]k
|-
| tongue || *mepreŋg
|-
| blood || *iendz
|-
| breast/milk || *mam
|-
| louse || *nemeŋg
|-
| dog || *n[ia]
|-
| pig || *k[o/u][a]
|-
| egg || *uak
|-
| tree/wood || *nd[ua]t
|-
| man/person || *ndz[ia]p
|-
| woman/wife || *jowa[k]
|-
| moon || *kumbanV
|-
| water || *ndzu
|-
| stone || *mete
|-
| name || *n[e/a][k/ŋg]
|-
| two || *[j]enapa; *sVp
|}

Cognates
Cognates among Kolopom languages listed by Evans (2018):

{| 
|+ Kolopom family cognates
! gloss !! Kimaghama !! Riantana !! Ndom !! Marori
|-
| stone || mɛtɛ || mɛtoe || mɛtə || mɛrɛ / mara
|-
| cheek || cama || cəma || – || sama
|-
| name || nɛ || na || nar || neɣ / naw
|-
| rope || niɛ || na || nɛɣ || naʒ
|}

Vocabulary comparison
The following basic vocabulary words are from McElhanon & Voorhoeve (1970) and Voorhoeve (1975), as cited in the Trans-New Guinea database:

{| class="wikitable sortable"
! gloss !! Kimaghima !! Ndom !! Riantana
|-
! head
| tuakwo || reːt || modo
|-
! hair
| muna || tomwen || rutivö
|-
! eye
| avuo || ununor || anömbö
|-
! tooth
| travae || trex || tudömbo
|-
! leg
| kura || tur || teː
|-
! louse
| nöme || neːmön || nöme
|-
! dog
| nöe || wawant || nia
|-
! pig
| ku || yar || ku
|-
! bird
| axanemö || nembörfe || ne
|-
! egg
| wo || wax || winömbana
|-
! blood
| dörö || eth || yerana
|-
! bone
| duno || in || nduka
|-
! skin
| krara || krikir || kwika
|-
! tree
| do || ndör; ndua || ndör; ndua
|-
! man
| ci || xarefe theref || rianoana
|-
! sun
| öre || wen || meːnoŋwa
|-
! water
| cu || wer || rö
|-
! fire
| i || u || drö
|-
! stone
| mete || meːt || metö
|-
! name
| ne || nar || ria
|-
! eat
| muye || xot || mora
|-
! one
| növere || sas || meːbö
|-
! two
| kave || thef || enava
|}

Evolution
Kolopom reflexes of proto-Trans-New Guinea (pTNG) etyma are:

Kimaghana language:
kura ‘leg’ < *k(a,o)ndok[V]
nome ‘louse’ < *niman
nanu ‘older sibling’ < *nana(i)

Riantana language:
mu ‘breast’ < *amu
modo ‘head’ < *mVtVna
nome ‘louse’ < *niman

References

External links 

 Timothy Usher, New Guinea World, Proto–Kolopom

 
Languages of Papua New Guinea
Cook River–Kolopom languages